Group dating is a modern pattern for dating where a group of single people organize a night out, with the hope of forming romantic partnerships. It is most popular in Japan, where it is known as gōkon. In the U.S., the group dating is becoming is a safe alternative to single dating (especially blind dating), also helping to ease tension, because both parties will feel more comfortable having the company of their friends.

Group dating is often recommended by parenting experts as more age appropriate form of dating for preteens than one-on-one dating.

Japan
Generally, a single man and woman who know each other organize the gōkon in advance, each agreeing to bring three or four eligible friends. The venue is usually a restaurant, an izakaya, or anywhere people can eat, drink and make a bit of noise.

The term gōkon comes from the Japanese words konpa (a party for members of a single group, class, or club) and gōdō ("together", "combination").  Generally speaking, gōkon are not primarily intended to result in one-night stands (something more associated with nanpa), but rather for making friends and possibly forming long-term relationships. Typically groups of men and women will sit opposite each other and converse with one another, while simultaneously whispering discussions with their same-sex peers about which potential partners they find attractive. Sometimes games are played to reduce tension and encourage a convivial atmosphere.

Recently, writing a text message on a mobile phone and showing it to others has become popular as an alternative to whispering.

United States
According to an article in USA Today:

Group online dating, its creators and practitioners say, is safer than traditional Internet dating: With friends in tow, there's little fear that a date will spike your drink during a trip to the bathroom. It's more natural, akin to happy-hour mixing. Going out in groups improves your odds, at least in theory. And if the opposing social circle doesn't live up to its virtual profile, well, it's a night out with your gang."

According to a San Diego Union-Tribune article:

[The Concept] is part of a growing trend in the lucrative online dating market – harnessing the power of friends. Several sites are tapping into the idea that most real-world relationships begin, like it or not, with the help and influence of friends and family.

United Kingdom
Gōkon-style events have also developed independently at Oxford and Cambridge universities, where they are known as 'crewdate' or 'swap', respectively.

See also
 Culture of Japan
 Online dating service

References

Sources

Further reading 
 
  Translated by Toshiya Fujii.
 

Dating
Japanese subcultures